Muhammad Aliff Najmi bin Shaaini is a Malaysian professional footballer who plays as a defender for Malaysia Super League club UiTM.

References

External links
 

Living people
Malaysian footballers
Malaysia Super League players
UiTM FC players
Association football defenders
Year of birth missing (living people)